Black Inches was a US-based gay pornographic magazine featuring African-American men. Published by Mavety Media alongside magazines such as Mandate, it was established in 1993 and folded in 2009.

Features
The photos appearing in the magazine had various sources; some are obtained from companies that produce gay pornographic films (although most layouts depict individual men, rather than simulated "action" scenes). Photographers whose work appeared in Black Inches include Anneli Adolfsson, Ken Kavanagh, Brian Lantelme, and Abednego (formerly associated with Mansurf.com). The magazine also carried film reviews, erotic stories, cartoons, and advertisements.

Black Inches in gay culture
D. J. Murphy's Sons Like Me starts with a reference to Black Inches in its first lines:
"What the hell is this, Travis?" My mom yelled as she held the Black Inches porno magazine in her hand.

Other novels that mention the magazine include John Weir's What I Did Wrong and Jim Norton's Happy Ending.

Black Inches featured every major gay black porn star in photo shoots and interviews, from Bobby Blake and Tyson Cane to Tiger Tyson, J. C. Carter, and T-Malone. Bobby Blake writes of his relationship with the magazine, "Black Inches was always very supportive of me. They reviewed every film I made, did photo-shoots, interviewed me, and gave me my own column."

In popular culture
 In Homestuck, Clubs Deuce carries a copy, except it is apparently about licorice rather than human pornography.
 In Problem Sleuth, Pickle Inspector finds a copy of Black Inches on a table alongside fictional gay pornographic magazine Hunk Rump

References

LGBT-related magazines published in the United States
Pornographic magazines published in the United States
Defunct magazines published in the United States
Ethnic pornography
Gay male pornography in the United States
Gay male pornographic magazines
LGBT African-American culture
Magazines established in 1993
Magazines disestablished in 2009
Magazines published in New York City
1993 establishments in New York City
2009 disestablishments in New York (state)